Lamar County Courthouse is located on Thomaston Street in Barnesville, Georgia. The county courthouse was designed by Eugene C. Wachendorff and built in 1931. It was added to the National Register of Historic Places on September 18, 1980.

See also
National Register of Historic Places listings in Lamar County, Georgia

References

County courthouses in Georgia (U.S. state)
Courthouses on the National Register of Historic Places in Georgia (U.S. state)
Government buildings completed in 1931
Buildings and structures in Lamar County, Georgia
National Register of Historic Places in Lamar County, Georgia